József Kreul Bugner (born 13 March 1950) is a Hungarian-born British-Australian former heavyweight boxer and actor. He holds triple nationality, being a citizen of Hungary and a naturalised citizen of both Australia and the United Kingdom. He  unsuccessfully challenged Muhammad Ali for the heavyweight championship in 1975, losing by unanimous decision. As an actor, he is best known for his role in the 1994 action film Street Fighter alongside Jean-Claude Van Damme and Raul Julia.

Born in Szőreg, a southeastern suburb of Szeged in southern Hungary, Bugner and his family fled after the 1956 Soviet invasion and settled in Britain. He was ranked among the world's top ten heavyweights in the 1970s, fighting such opponents as Muhammad Ali, Joe Frazier, Ron Lyle, Jimmy Ellis, Manuel Ramos, Chuck Wepner, Earnie Shavers, Henry Cooper, Brian London, Mac Foster, Rudie Lubbers, Eduardo Corletti, Jurgen Blin and George Johnson.

Bugner retired from boxing in 1976, but over the next two decades, he made sporadic comebacks with varying success. He moved to Australia in 1986, adopting the nickname "Aussie Joe", beating fighters such as Greg Page, David Bey, Anders Eklund and James Tillis before retiring again after a TKO loss to Frank Bruno in 1987. He made a final comeback during the 1990s, winning the Australian heavyweight title in 1995 and the lightly regarded World Boxing Federation (WBF) heavyweight championship in 1998 at the age of 48 against James "Bonecrusher" Smith. He retired for the last time in 1999 with a final record of 69-13-1, including 43 wins by knockout.

Early years
Bugner and his family fled to the United Kingdom in the late 1950s because of the Soviet Union's invasion of Hungary in 1956 after the Hungarian Uprising of that year. Initially, he was one of about 80 refugees housed in the students' Hostel at Smedley's factory in Wisbech. They settled in the Huntingdonshire town of St Ives  near the Fens, and so, as local custom dictated, he was known as a Fen Tiger. At school, Bugner excelled in sports and was the national junior discus champion in 1964. He lived and trained in Bedford during his early boxing years; he was a regular at Bedford Boys Club under the training of Paul King and attended Goldington Road School in Bedford.

Boxing career

1960s
Bugner had a short amateur career, fighting sixteen times and winning thirteen bouts. He turned professional in 1967 (at the unusually young age of seventeen) on the advice of his then-trainer and friend, Andy Smith. Smith was unhappy with the choice of Bugner's opponents and believed that he could better control the quality of his opponents if Bugner turned professional. He had a losing debut against Paul Brown on 20 December 1967 at the London Hilton, where he suffered a TKO in the third round. Showing gritty determination after his debut, the teenage Bugner went on to win a remarkable 18 consecutive fights in under two years during 1968 and 1969 (including 13 stoppage victories) before narrowly losing to the older and vastly more experienced Dick Hall. He bounced back and rounded off the 1960s with three further stoppage victories.

1970s
In 1970 Bugner emerged internationally as an outstanding young prospect, and by the end of the year, he was world-rated. He won nine consecutive bouts that year, including victories over well-known boxers such as Chuck Wepner, Manuel Ramos, Johnny Prescott, Brian London, Eduardo Corletti, Charley Polite, and George Johnson.

Bugner was now positioned to challenge world-rated Englishman Henry Cooper, who had nearly knocked out Muhammad Ali a few years previously, for Cooper's British, British Commonwealth and European titles. However, because Bugner was still too young to fight for the British Commonwealth title (the minimum age was twenty-one years old at the time), this much-anticipated bout had to be postponed until the following year. While waiting to come of age, in 1971, he defeated Carl Gizzi and drew with Bill Drover just weeks later and weeks before facing Cooper.

Early in his professional years, Bugner earned a reputation as a tough, durable but often exceptionally defensive and cautious boxer; he retained that image for the rest of his career. He was often criticised for lacking natural aggression in the ring. Some observers argued that Bugner's heart was never in boxing after an early opponent, Ulric Regis, died from brain injuries soon after being outpointed by Bugner at London's Shoreditch Town Hall. Many said that Bugner never punched his full weight after that.

Defeat of Henry Cooper
In March 1971, Bugner finally met veteran Cooper, and won a fifteen-round decision. Bugner won the bout by the slimmest of margins, 1/4 point, on the card of the lone official, Harry Gibbs. The British sporting public and press were deeply divided about the verdict. Many felt that Cooper deserved the decision due to his steady aggression. But Bugner fought effectively on the defence and often scored with his left jab, and in the opinion of many, was the rightful winner of the bout. The Times, among others, scored the fight in favour of Bugner. Still, the outcome of the bout is regarded as one of the most controversial in British boxing history.

Nonetheless, Bugner was now the British, British Commonwealth, and European champion, and for the first time, he was ranked among the world's top ten heavyweights. Bugner would remain in the world ratings for most of the 1970s.

Bugner retained his European title with a decision over tough German heavyweight Jürgen Blin.

However, later in 1971, Bugner surprisingly lost decisions to underdogs Jack Bodell and Larry Middleton; sandwiched between these losses was a victory over Mike Boswell. The Bodell fight was particularly costly, depriving Bugner of his British, British Commonwealth and European championships. Bugner's relative inexperience, his youth and lack of an extensive amateur background were the chief causes of these defeats.

In 1972 Bugner won eight consecutive fights, including a knockout over Jürgen Blin for the European championship. By the end of this, Bugner demonstrated much-improved ring ability and acquired enough experience that his manager began seeking matches against the world's best heavyweights.

Prime years
In 1973 Bugner began the year by retaining his European belt with a victory over the capable Dutchman Rudie Lubbers. The 23-year-old Bugner then lost twelve-round decisions to Muhammad Ali and Joe Frazier. Despite being clearly defeated, Bugner fought well and won the respect of the boxing media and the public alike. After their bout, Ali declared that Bugner was capable of being world champion. Ali's trainer Angelo Dundee later echoed that sentiment. The fight with Frazier in July 1973 at Earls Court in London was deemed a classic. After being knocked down by a tremendous left hook in the tenth round, Bugner arose and staggered Frazier to close the round. Frazier took the decision, but only narrowly, and arguably only George Foreman and Muhammad Ali ever gave Frazier a harder fight. Many regard the Frazier bout as being Bugner's best career performance.

After the Ali and Frazier fights, Bugner won a further 8 bouts in a row, his most notable victories being over ex-WBA World Heavyweight Champion Jimmy Ellis, and Mac Foster. By the end of 1974, Bugner was rated among the top five heavyweight contenders in the world.

Bugner challenged Muhammad Ali for the world championship in June 1975, the bout being held in Kuala Lumpur, with Ali winning a relatively one-sided fifteen-round decision. Bugner performed fairly well but maintained a strictly defensive posture throughout most of this fight, perhaps due to the blistering tropical heat, and as a result, he was widely scorned by the media and public. In an interview during an April 2008 reunion with Henry Cooper, Bugner defended his tactics in the Ali fight as having been necessary due to the extreme temperature and humidity of the outside venue.

Regains British, European & Commonwealth titles

Early in 1976, Bugner announced his retirement from boxing, stating that he no longer felt motivated to fight professionally. Within months however he returned to the ring, expressing disgust at Richard Dunn's performance against Ali and in October, he blasted out Richard Dunn in the first round to reclaim the British, British Commonwealth and European championships. Onlookers state that they had never seen Bugner angry before and that while Dunn's supporters had waged a quite unsportsmanlike campaign against Bugner, if he had fought like that in his earlier career, he could have gone further.

In 1977, Bugner lost a close twelve-round decision away from home to top contender Ron Lyle. The scores were 57–53 and 56–54 for Lyle against 55–54 for Bugner. After this bout, Bugner again retired, making only sporadic comebacks to the ring over the next decades.

1980s
Bugner returned to the ring for brief periods in the 1980s and 1990s but was never as effective as he had been during his prime due to his age and inactivity.

After a three-year absence from the ring, Bugner returned in May 1980, knocking out fringe contender Gilberto Acuna, before promptly retiring again. In 1982, a ring-rusty Bugner (having had only one short fight in 5 years and weighing in some 25 lbs above his prime fighting weight) fought the hard-hitting top contender Earnie Shavers, but was stopped in the second round due to a badly cut eye. However, Bugner decided to continue his comeback, stopping the useful John Denis and fringe contender Danny Sutton, as well as domestic contenders Winston Allen and Eddie Neilson. In 1983, a subdued and unmotivated Bugner lost to Marvis Frazier, showing little ambition throughout the bout. He followed this with a decision over future European champion Anders Eklund and a controversial loss to future World Title challenger Steffen Tangstad. Bugner appeared to have done enough to win the Tangstad fight, however, like with the Frazier and Eklund bouts, he appeared unmotivated and uninterested throughout.

Comeback in Australia
In 1986 Bugner moved to Australia, where he adopted the nickname Aussie Joe after becoming an Australian citizen. In Australia, Bugner launched a fairly successful comeback, earning good victories over world title contenders James Tillis and David Bey and an impressive victory over former WBA heavyweight champion Greg Page, gaining a world ranking in the process, after which he spoke of challenging reigning heavyweight champion Mike Tyson. However, there was great clamour for a fight with fellow Briton Frank Bruno. The bout was touted as the biggest all-British heavyweight bout since Cooper Vs Bugner in 1971. The bout took place on 24 October 1987, and Bugner suffered an eighth-round TKO loss to the much younger and fresher world title contender for the Commonwealth championship in front of a huge crowd at White Hart Lane football stadium. Bugner promptly retired again following this defeat, only his 3rd stoppage defeat in 20 years.

1990s

Inspired by the 45-year-old George Foreman's recapture of the heavyweight title, Bugner made a final comeback in 1995, beating Vince Cervi to win the Australian heavyweight title, followed by a win over West Turner. Bugner then fought fellow Briton and world title contender Scott Welch for the WBO Intercontinental Heavyweight Title. Welch proved too young and fresh for the now 46-year-old Bugner, handing him a TKO defeat in the 6th round.

Bugner continued to fight on against far younger opponents. In 1996 he defeated the respectable Young Haumona for the Pacific and Australasian Heavyweight title, retained it against Waisiki Ligaloa in 1997, added the Australian title by defeating the tough Colin Wilson and defending both titles against Bob Mirovic in 1998.

In 1998 Bugner's long-term tenacity finally gave him a world crown, albeit a lightly regarded title - the WBF version of the heavyweight crown  - by defeating former WBA World Heavyweight Champion James "Bonecrusher" Smith. At the age of 48 years and 110 days, it made him the oldest ever boxer to hold a minor championship belt.

Bugner fought just once more. In June 1999, at the age of 49, he defeated the durable fringe contender Levi Billups, who was disqualified for low blows.

Fight record
His record for 83 professional fights is 69 wins (41 on knockouts), 13 Losses and 1 Draw.

In an interview in 2004, Bugner said that the hardest puncher he had ever faced was Earnie Shavers and the biggest beating he took was from Ron Lyle.

Life outside boxing
After moving to Australia, Bugner and his wife, Marlene, opened a vineyard. It failed in 1989, and he lost an estimated two million Australian dollars. He now lives in Brisbane, Queensland.

Bugner has worked in the film industry. During the 1970s, he appeared in one of several PSAs themed Be Smart, Be Safe; these dealt with instructing children on how to safely cross a road or a street. In 1979 Bugner featured in an Italian film, Io sto con gli ippopotami with Bud Spencer and Terence Hill, he worked with Bud Spencer in his films in the 1980s. He worked as the expert adviser on the Russell Crowe film, Cinderella Man, which was a film about the heavyweight boxer James J. Braddock. Bugner was dropped part way through the project, which prompted him to call Crowe, "a gutless worm and a f*****g girl".

Bugner suffers from a serious back injury he sustained from training for fights in his middle years. He also has financial problems. These financial problems prompted him to re-enter the ring at such an advanced age. A benefit was held for Bugner in 2008 by Kevin Lueshing.

In November 2009, Bugner replaced Camilla Dallerup on day 4 of the British TV show I'm A Celebrity Get Me Out Of Here!. He left the show on day 16 after losing a bushtucker trial called 'Jungle Jail' to fellow celebrity Stuart Manning.

Bugner has three children, James, Joe Jr., and Amy, from his ex-wife Melody.

Bugner's autobiography, Joe Bugner - My Story, was published by New Holland Publishing (Australia) in November 2013.

Professional boxing record

|-
| style="text-align:center;" colspan="9"|69 Wins (43 knockouts, 26 decisions, 2 disqualifications), 13 Losses (4 knockouts, 9 decisions), 1 Draw
|-  style="text-align:center; background:#e3e3e3;"
|  style="border-style:none none solid solid; "|Res.
|  style="border-style:none none solid solid; "|Record
|  style="border-style:none none solid solid; "|Opponent
|  style="border-style:none none solid solid; "|Type
|  style="border-style:none none solid solid; "|Rd., Time
|  style="border-style:none none solid solid; "|Date
|  style="border-style:none none solid solid; "|Location
|  style="border-style:none none solid solid; "|Notes
|- align=center
|Win
|69-13-1
|align=left| Levi Billups
|DQ
|9 
|1999-06-13
|align=left|Broadbeach, Australia
|
|- align=center
|Win
|68-13-1
|align=left| James Smith
|TKO
|1 
|1998-07-04
|align=left|Carrara, Australia
|align=left|
|- align=center
|Win
|67-13-1
|align=left| Bob Mirovic
|SD
|12 
|1998-04-20
|align=left|Carrara, Australia
|align=left|
|- align=center
|Win
|66-13-1
|align=left| Colin Wilson
|UD
|12 
|1998-01-13
|align=left|Broadbeach, Australia
|align=left|
|- align=center
|Win
|65-13-1
|align=left| Waisiki Ligaloa
|TKO
|7 
|1997-06-03
|align=left|Southport, Australia
|align=left|
|- align=center
|Win
|64-13-1
|align=left| Young Haumona
|KO
|5 
|1996-07-05
|align=left|Carrara, Australia
|align=left|
|- align=center
|Loss
|63-13-1
|align=left| Scott Welch
|TKO
|6 
|1996-03-16
|align=left|Berlin, Germany
|align=left|
|- align=center
|Win
|63-12-1
|align=left| West Turner
|KO
|3 
|1996-02-02
|align=left|Perth, Australia
|
|- align=center
|Win
|62-12-1
|align=left| Vince Cervi
|UD
|12 
|1995-09-22
|align=left|Carrara, Australia
|align=left|
|- align=center
|Loss
|61-12-1
|align=left| Frank Bruno
|TKO
|8 
|1987-10-24
|align=left|White Hart Lane, London
|
|- align=center
|Win
|61-11-1
|align=left| Greg Page
|UD
|10 
|1987-07-24
|align=left|Sydney, Australia
|
|- align=center
|Win
|60-11-1
|align=left| David Bey
|UD
|10 
|1986-11-14
|align=left|Sydney, Australia
|
|- align=center
|Win
|59-11-1
|align=left| James Tillis
|PTS
|10 
|1986-09-15
|align=left|Sydney, Australia
|
|- align=center
|Loss
|58-11-1
|align=left| Steffen Tangstad
|SD
|10 
|1984-02-18
|align=left|Copenhagen, Denmark
|
|- align=center
|Win
|58-10-1
|align=left| Anders Eklund
|MD
|10 
|1984-01-13
|align=left|Randers, Denmark
|
|- align=center
|Loss
|57-10-1
|align=left| Marvis Frazier
|UD
|10 
|1983-06-04
|align=left|Atlantic City, New Jersey
|
|- align=center
|Win
|57-9-1
|align=left| Danny Sutton
|TKO
|9 
|1983-04-20
|align=left|Muswell Hill, London
|
|- align=center
|Win
|56-9-1
|align=left| John Dino Denis
|TKO
|3 
|1983-02-16
|align=left|Wood Green, London
|
|- align=center
|Win
|55-9-1
|align=left| Eddie Neilson
|TKO
|5 
|1982-12-09
|align=left|Bloomsbury, London
|
|- align=center
|Win
|54-9-1
|align=left| Winston Allen
|KO
|3 
|1982-10-28
|align=left|Bloomsbury, London
|
|- align=center
|Loss
|53-9-1
|align=left| Earnie Shavers
|TKO
|2 
|1982-05-08
|align=left|Reunion Arena, Dallas
|align=left|
|- align=center
|Win
|53-8-1
|align=left| Gilberto Acuna
|TKO
|6 
|1980-08-23
|align=left|Inglewood, California
|align=left|
|- align=center
|Loss
|52-8-1
|align=left| Ron Lyle
|SD
|12 
|1977-03-20
|align=left|Caesars Palace, Nevada
|align=left|
|- align=center
|Won
|52-7-1
|align=left| Richard Dunn
|KO
|1 
|1976-10-12
|align=left|Wembley, London
|align=left|
|- align=center
|Loss
|51-7-1
|align=left| Muhammad Ali
|UD
|15 
||1975-07-01
|align=left|Merdeka Stadium, Kuala Lumpur
|align=left|
|- align=center
|Win
|51-6-1
|align=left| Dante Cane
|TKO
|5 
|1975-02-28
|align=left|Bologna, Italy
|align=left|
|- align=center
|Win
|50-6-1
|align=left| Santiago Alberto Lovell
|TKO
|2 
|1974-12-03
|align=left|Royal Albert Hall, London
|align=left|
|- align=center
|Win
|49-6-1
|align=left| Jimmy Ellis
|PTS
|10 
|1974-11-12
|align=left|Wembley, London
|align=left|
|- align=center
|Win
|48-6-1
|align=left| Jose Luis Garcia
|KO
|2 
|1974-10-01
|align=left|Wembley, London
|align=left|
|- align=center
|Win
|47-6-1
|align=left| Piermario Baruzzi
|TKO
|10 
|1974-05-29
|align=left|Copenhagen, Denmark
|align=left|
|- align=center
|Win
|46-6-1
|align=left| Pat Duncan
|PTS
|10 
|1974-03-12
|align=left|Wembley, London
|align=left|
|- align=center
|Win
|45-6-1
|align=left| Mac Foster
|PTS
|10 
|1973-11-13
|align=left|Wembley, London
|align=left|
|- align=center
|Win
|44-6-1
|align=left| Giuseppe Ros
|PTS
|15 
|1973-10-02
|align=left|Royal Albert Hall, London
|align=left|
|- align=center
|Loss
|43-6-1
|align=left| Joe Frazier
|PTS
|12 
|1973-07-02
|align=left|Earls Court, London
|align=left|
|- align=center
|Loss
|43-5-1
|align=left| Muhammad Ali
|UD
|12 
|1973-02-14
|align=left|Las Vegas, Nevada
|align=left|
|- align=center
|Win
|43-4-1
|align=left| Rudie Lubbers
|UD
|15 
|1973-01-16
|align=left|Royal Albert Hall, London
|align=left|
|- align=center
|Win
|42-4-1
|align=left| Dante Cane
|TKO
|6 
|1972-11-28
|align=left|Ice Rink, Nottingham
|align=left|
|- align=center
|Win
|41-4-1
|align=left| Tony Doyle
|TKO
|8 
|1972-11-14
|align=left|Wembley, London
|align=left|
|- align=center
|Win
|40-4-1
|align=left| Jürgen Blin
|KO
|8 
|1972-10-10
|align=left|Royal Albert Hall, London
|align=left|
|- align=center
|Win
|39-4-1
|align=left| Paul Nielsen
|TKO
|6 
|1972-07-19
|align=left|Croke Park, Dublin
|align=left|
|- align=center
|Win
|38-4-1
|align=left| Doug Kirk
|TKO
|5 
|1972-06-06
|align=left|Royal Albert Hall, London
|align=left|
|- align=center
|Win
|37-4-1
|align=left| Marc Hans
|TKO
|3 
|1972-05-09
|align=left|Wembley, London
|align=left|
|- align=center
|Win
|36-4-1
|align=left| Leroy Caldwell
|DQ
|5 
|1972-04-25
|align=left|Royal Albert Hall, London
|align=left|
|- align=center
|Win
|35-4-1
|align=left| Brian O'Melia
|TKO
|2 
|1972-03-28
|align=left|Wembley, London
|align=left|
|- align=center
|Loss
|34-4-1
|align=left| Larry Middleton
|PTS
|10 
|1971-11-24
|align=left|Ice Rink, Nottingham
|
|- align=center
|Win
|34-3-1
|align=left| Mike Boswell
|UD
|10 
|1971-11-17
|align=left|Houston, Texas
|align=left|
|- align=center
|Loss
|33-3-1
|align=left| Jack Bodell
|PTS
|15 
|1971-09-27
|align=left|Wembley, London
|align=left|
|- align=center
|Win
|33-2-1
|align=left| Jürgen Blin
|PTS
|15 
|1971-05-11
|align=left|Wembley, London
|align=left|
|- align=center
|Win
|32-2-1
|align=left| Henry Cooper
|PTS
|15 
|1971-03-16
|align=left|Wembley, London
|align=left|
|- align=center
|style="background: #B0C4DE"|Draw
|31-2-1
|align=left| Bill Drover
|PTS
|10 
|1971-02-10
|align=left|Bethnal Green, London
|align=left|
|- align=center
|Win
|31-2
|align=left| Carl Gizzi
|PTS
|10 
|1971-01-19
|align=left|Royal Albert Hall, London
|
|- align=center
|Win
|30-2
|align=left| Miguel Angel Paez
|TKO
|3 
|1970-12-08
|align=left|Royal Albert Hall, London
|
|- align=center
|Win
|29-2
|align=left| George Johnson
|PTS
|10 
|1970-11-03
|align=left|Royal Albert Hall, London
|
|- align=center
|Win
|28-2
|align=left| Hector Eduardo Corletti
|PTS
|10 
|1970-10-06
|align=left|Royal Albert Hall, London
|align=left|
|- align=center
|Win
|27-2
|align=left| Chuck Wepner
|TKO
|3 
|1970-09-08
|align=left|Wembley, London
|align=left|
|- align=center
|Win
|26-2
|align=left| Brian London
|TKO
|5 
|1970-05-12
|align=left|Wembley, London
|align=left|
|- align=center
|Win
|25-2
|align=left| Ray Patterson
|PTS
|8 
|1970-04-21
|align=left|Royal Albert Hall, London
|
|- align=center
|Win
|24-2
|align=left| Manuel Ramos
|PTS
|4 
|1970-03-24
|align=left|Wembley, London
|
|- align=center
|Win
|23-2
|align=left| Roberto Davila
|TKO
|4 
|1970-02-10
|align=left|Picadilly, London
|
|- align=center
|Win
|22-2
|align=left| Johnny Prescott
|PTS
|8 
|1970-01-20
|align=left|Royal Albert Hall, London
|
|- align=center
|Win
|21-2
|align=left| Charley Polite
|TKO
|3 
|1969-12-09
|align=left|Royal Albert Hall, London
|
|- align=center
|Win
|20-2
|align=left| Eddie Talhami
|TKO
|4 
|1969-11-11
|align=left|Royal Albert Hall, London
|
|- align=center
|Win
|19-2
|align=left| Phil Smith
|TKO
|2 
|1969-10-14
|align=left|Royal Albert Hall, London
|
|- align=center
|Loss
|18-2
|align=left| Dick Hall
|PTS
|8 
|1969-08-04
|align=left|Hotel Piccadilly, Manchester
|
|- align=center
|Win
|18-1
|align=left| Moses Harrell
|PTS
|8 
|1969-06-09
|align=left|Belle Vue, Manchester
|
|- align=center
|Win
|17-1
|align=left| Tony Ventura
|PTS
|8 
|1969-05-20
|align=left|Royal Albert Hall, London
|
|- align=center
|Win
|16-1
|align=left| Jack O'Halloran
|PTS
|8 
|1969-04-15
|align=left|Royal Albert Hall, London
|
|- align=center
|Win
|15-1
|align=left| Lion Ven
|TKO
|5 
|1969-03-25
|align=left|Wembley, London
|
|- align=center
|Win
|14-1
|align=left| Ulric Regis
|PTS
|8 
|1969-03-11
|align=left|Shoreditch, London
|
|- align=center
|Win
|13-1
|align=left| Terry Feeley
|TKO
|1 
|1969-02-25
|align=left|Royal Albert Hall, London
|
|- align=center
|Win
|12-1
|align=left| Rudolph Vaughan
|TKO
|2 
|1969-01-21
|align=left|Kensington, London
|
|- align=center
|Win
|11-1
|align=left| George Dulaire
|TKO
|4 
|1968-12-19
|align=left|Bethnal Green, London
|
|- align=center
|Win
|10-1
|align=left| Gene Innocent
|TKO
|3 
|1968-11-12
|align=left|Wembley, London
|
|- align=center
|Win
|9-1
|align=left| Paul Brown
|TKO
|3 
|1968-11-04
|align=left|Connaught Rooms, London
|
|- align=center
|Win
|8-1
|align=left| Vic Moore
|TKO
|1 
|1968-10-08
|align=left|Royal Albert Hall, London
|
|- align=center
|Win
|7-1
|align=left| Obe Hepburn
|TKO
|1 
|1968-08-18
|align=left|Wembley, London
|
|- align=center
|Win
|6-1
|align=left| Paul Brown
|TKO
|4 
|1968-05-28
|align=left|Royal Albert Hall, London
|
|- align=center
|Win
|5-1
|align=left| Billy Wynter
|PTS
|6 
|1968-05-21
|align=left|Bethnal Green, London
|
|- align=center
|Win
|4-1
|align=left| Mick Oliver
|RTD
|3 
|1968-05-06
|align=left|Mayfair, London
|
|- align=center
|Win
|3-1
|align=left| Bert Johnson
|KO
|3 
|1968-03-26
|align=left|Bethnal Green, London
|
|- align=center
|Win
|2-1
|align=left| Jim McIlvaney
|TKO
|2 
|1968-02-27
|align=left|Bethnal Green, London
|
|- align=center
|Win
|1-1
|align=left| Paul Cassidy
|TKO
|2 
|1968-01-30
|align=left|Bethnal Green, London
|
|- align=center
|Loss
|0-1
|align=left| Paul Brown
|KO
|3 
|1967-12-20
|align=left|Mayfair, London
|

Exhibition boxing record

References

External links
 
 Career Record Extended
 

1950 births
Sportspeople from Szeged
Australian male boxers
Heavyweight boxers
Australian people of Hungarian descent
Hungarian emigrants to England
Living people
People from St Ives, Cambridgeshire
European Boxing Union champions
English male boxers
Commonwealth Boxing Council champions
English emigrants to Australia
Sportspeople from Cambridgeshire
Naturalised citizens of Australia
Naturalised citizens of the United Kingdom
I'm a Celebrity...Get Me Out of Here! (British TV series) participants